is a Japanese swimmer. She competed in two events at the 1984 Summer Olympics.

References

External links
 

1963 births
Living people
Japanese female butterfly swimmers
Olympic swimmers of Japan
Swimmers at the 1984 Summer Olympics
Universiade medalists in swimming
Place of birth missing (living people)
Asian Games medalists in swimming
Asian Games silver medalists for Japan
Swimmers at the 1978 Asian Games
Medalists at the 1978 Asian Games
Universiade silver medalists for Japan
Universiade bronze medalists for Japan
Medalists at the 1983 Summer Universiade
20th-century Japanese women